Saint Dyfnan was an obscure Welsh saint. He was sometimes accounted a son of Brychan, the invading Irish king of Brycheiniog.

Legacy
Llanddyfnan ("St Dyfnan's") was dedicated to him on Anglesey and claimed his relics.  He is commemorated on 24 April.

References

Year of birth unknown
Year of death unknown
Children of Brychan
Welsh Roman Catholic saints
5th-century Welsh people
5th-century Christian saints